A solemn assembly is a formal and sacred procedure in the Church of Jesus Christ of Latter-day Saints (LDS Church) conducted to give added emphasis to the purpose of the occasion. Solemn assemblies are held at the dedications of temples and for specially-called meetings to provide instruction to church leaders. Solemn assemblies are also held for the purpose of sustaining a new church president, who church members consider to be a prophet, seer, and revelator. Such assemblies are held, in particular, to follow the law of common consent. In 1831, a year after Joseph Smith established the Church of Christ, church members believe he was instructed by revelation to "call your solemn assembly, that your fastings and your mourning might come up into the ears of the Lord of Sabaoth." Historically, solemn assemblies were held on special occasions of major religious importance in ancient Israel.

Connected with temple dedications

The first solemn assembly connected to a temple dedication in modern times was held on March 30, 1836, as part of the dedication of the Kirtland Temple, the first temple built in the Latter Day Saint movement. Prior to the dedication, Smith taught church members, "We must have all things prepared, and call our solemn assembly as the Lord has commanded us, that we may be able to accomplish His great work, and it must be done in God's own way. The House of the Lord must be prepared, and the solemn assembly called and organized in it, according to the order of the House of God." The dedication of the Kirtland Temple introduced many elements of solemn assemblies connected with temple dedications that are still used today, including the Hosanna Shout and the singing of "The Spirit of God Like a Fire Is Burning," a hymn written by W. W. Phelps. Solemn assemblies have been held in connection with the dedications of all LDS Church temples.

Sustaining new church presidents

At the first general conference after the death of a church president and the calling of his successor, the session at which the sustaining vote takes place is called a solemn assembly. During a solemn assembly sustaining, groups of church members are asked to stand in succession and sustain the new president, along with his counselors and the Quorum of the Twelve Apostles. Historically, the order of the sustaining groups has been: the First Presidency, the Quorum of the Twelve, the Quorums of Seventy and Presiding Bishopric, the remaining Melchizedek priesthood holders, Aaronic priesthood holders, and then all church members together. In more recent solemn assemblies, female church members aged 18 and older who constitute the Relief Society and female church members aged 12 to 18 who constitute the Young Women organization have been asked to stand and vote as distinct groups as well. The order of the April 2018 Solemn Assembly to sustain Russell M. Nelson was changed slightly.  The sustaining by Melchizedek Priesthood holders was followed by the Relief Society, then the Aaronic Priesthood, the Young Women, and the church at large.

After the First Presidency votes, the other groups in turn, and then all the members of the church together, including those who have voted previously, are asked to stand wherever they may be at the time and vote in a single call to sustain, or oppose, the new president, along with his counselors and the Quorum of the Twelve. Until the spring general conference of 1973, solemn assemblies included a vote for the sustaining of the Patriarch to the Church (formerly Presiding Patriarch), which office was abolished in 1979. Local seventies were explicitly included as part of the Melchizedek priesthood voting group as well, until the 1986 dissolution of local quorums of seventy at the stake level. The entire procedure until then had lasted a half hour, given that the voting had been done separately for each of the positions being called upon.

The sustaining vote of a solemn assembly is observed by general authorities at gatherings of church members at satellite locations on Temple Square, such as the Salt Lake Tabernacle and the Assembly Hall. The voting is observed by members of stake presidencies at local meetinghouse locations around the world, and observers are asked to invite those who oppose to meet with their stake president.

During the solemn assembly held on April 6, 1973 at which Spencer W. Kimball was sustained as the church's 12th president, N. Eldon Tanner described the purpose and deep spiritual meaning of such occasions for church members: 

Joseph Smith and his counselors in the original First Presidency were sustained in a solemn assembly in the Kirtland Temple on March 27, 1836 and Brigham Young was sustained in a solemn assembly on December 27, 1847 in the Kanesville Tabernacle in Council Bluffs, Iowa. The first solemn assembly sustaining to take place in the Salt Lake Tabernacle was on October 10, 1880 when John Taylor was sustained as the church's third president. Solemn assembly sustainings were held in the Salt Lake Tabernacle for the next twelve presidents of the church. The solemn assembly sustaining for Heber J. Grant, the 7th church president, was postponed by three months because of the worldwide flu pandemic in 1918-1919. Gordon B. Hinckley, the 15th president of the church, was the last church president to be sustained in a solemn assembly held in the Salt Lake Tabernacle on April 2, 1995. All subsequent solemn assembly sustainings have taken place in the Conference Center near Temple Square in Salt Lake City. 

The most recent solemn assembly sustaining took place during the opening session of general conference on March 31, 2018, where Russell M. Nelson was sustained as the church's 17th president. Other changes in church leadership were presented for sustaining vote as part of the 2018 solemn assembly, and the process was split between Nelson's two counselors over two sessions. The business of the solemn assembly was conducted by Nelson's second counselor, Henry B. Eyring, in the Saturday morning session, with other changes presented by first counselor, Dallin H. Oaks, in the session on Saturday afternoon.

Other occasions
Solemn assemblies have been held in the LDS Church on other occasions to emphasize instruction and counsel to church members, to commemorate special occasions, and to introduce new scripture. A solemn assembly was held on July 2, 1889 in the Salt Lake Temple where Lorenzo Snow, the church's 5th president, re-emphasized the need for church members to faithfully practice the law of tithing.  A solemn assembly was held on April 5, 2020 to commemorate the 200th anniversary of Joseph Smith's theophany, known as the First Vision, and included a hosanna shout and singing of "The Spirit of God Like a Fire is Burning." This solemn assembly was conducted via broadcast from an almost empty auditorium in the Church Office Building in Salt Lake City because of restrictions on large gatherings during the global  COVID-19 pandemic. Nearly all church members and leaders who participated in this solemn assembly did so virtually from their own residences.

In ancient Israel

The Old Testament records that the people of Israel met in solemn assemblies on several occasions and for various purposes. A solemn assembly was most often held on the feast day at the end of Passover and the feast day at the end of the Feast of Tabernacles (Sukkot). Solemn assemblies in ancient Israel were also held for other special occasions, including at the dedication of Solomon's Temple. Joel wrote that solemn assemblies would be held in future times of great crisis. Joel's writings have been interpreted by some Christians, including the LDS Church, to be prophecies about events that will occur in the time just prior to the Second Coming of Jesus Christ. Solemn assemblies held in the LDS Church today are viewed as a part of the “restitution of all things, which God hath spoken by thy mouth of all his holy prophets since the world began” in the context of practices of ancient Israel (especially temple dedications), and as part of the fulfillment of Joel's prophecies.

In other denominations
Other Christian denominations follow the Old Testament practice of holding solemn assembly gatherings. The reasons for these solemn assemblies vary, but typically involve renewing or strengthening adherents' relationship with Christ, closeness with God, or general feeling of holiness.  These gatherings are not usually connected to formal procedural events like sustainings and dedications, but are more similar to the occasional solemn assemblies used in the LDS Church for instruction and worship.

Notes

External links
"What is a Solemn Assembly?", “I Have a Question," ''Ensign, December 1988, pp. 53–55
Solemn assemblies explained by LDS Church historian Elder Marlin K. Jensen
Solemn Assembly, April 2008, a recent Solemn Assembly procedure in April 2008, in which Thomas S. Monson was sustained as 16th Church President

Latter Day Saint terms
Worship services of the Church of Jesus Christ of Latter-day Saints
Latter Day Saint conferences